John Hill Maccann, or Professor Maccann (variously rendered as Maccann, MacCann or McCann) was a concertina player and designer from Plymouth, England. In 1884, Maccann patented a new design of Duet concertina, which became the first successful and most widely accepted layout of that instrument. Maccann's layout was a refinement of the earlier "Duette" system developed by Charles Wheatstone, inventor of the concertina. Initially called the "New Chromatic Duet English Concertina", it was to later be called simply the "Maccann system".

In addition to his designing, Maccann also played the concertina for earlier recordings, and toured as a musician playing the concertina (as did his mother as well). Historical records note his playing blocks of shows in Glasgow in 1888, a command performance for the Prince of Wales, an 1890-1891 North American tour, and an early 20th century tour of Australia.

Discography
 Empire March (~1900, Edison-Bell cylinder)
 Goodbye, Dolly Gray

References

Concertina players
Musicians from Plymouth, Devon